Speleonaut (named from the Greek words for "cave" and "sailor") is the submersible used by the cave diver Jochen Hasenmayer. After the 1989 decompression accident that left his legs paralyzed, Hasenmayer designed the Speleonaut with his friend Konrad Gehringer in order to continue exploring the Blauhöhle cave system, which begins at the base of the Blautopf spring in the Swabian Jura mountain range. It is the first submarine designed specifically for the exploration of caves.

The Speleonaut was first used at the Blautopf in 1996. In 2001 Hasenmayer reached the Mörikedom ("Mörike cathedral") chamber of the Blauhöhle, which he had discovered in 1985, in the Speleonaut. In 2004 he reached a point beyond the Mörikedom  into the mountain. In the same year he discovered two more large chambers in the Blauhöhle: the Mittelschiff (or "nave") and the Äonendom.

References

External links 
 
 

Submarines of Germany
Cave diving
1996 ships
Research submarines of Germany